The Golden Cross is a Grade II listed public house at the junction of Customhouse Street and Hayes Bridge Road in the centre of Cardiff, Wales. The current building dates from 1903 and is noted for its distinctive ceramic tiling.

History
A pub has existed on the site since 1849, originally named the Shields and Newcastle Tavern. It was renamed the Castle Inn in 1855 and assumed its present name in 1863. The Cardiff historian Brian Lee has said the Golden Cross "developed a reputation as the smartest brothel in town" in the 19th century. Around 1903/4 it was rebult in its current form  for Brains Brewery.

The Golden Cross is alleged to be the site of a fight involving a young Rocky Marciano, who was stationed in Wales during his time in the United States Army during World War 2. Also during the war, the fascist leader Oswald Mosley attempted to hold a meeting at the pub but violent opposition forced him to return to London.

The pub was given listed status by Cadw in May 1975, but despite this it was threatened with demolition in 1979 as part of a road-widening scheme. However it was reprieved after a campaign led by the South Wales Echo.  In 2010 it was listed by CAMRA as one of their 10 most unspoilt pubs by the CAMRA Pub Heritage Group and is listed on CAMRA's National Inventory of Historic Pub Interiors.

The Golden Cross has become a popular gay friendly pub, with regular drag acts and entertainment. It was voted in 2004 as the best gay pub in the UK. The pub remains a tied house of the Brains Brewery.

Architecture

CAMRA's Inventory of Historic Pub Interiors describes the Golden Cross as "the most spectacularly decorated of any in Wales".

The bar tiles, featuring distinctive corner grotesques, were designed by Craven Dunnill of Shropshire. The interior has several decorative pictorial panels of tiles that depict Cardiff Castle, Brains Brewery in 1890, and Cardiff's Old Town hall with a statue of Lord Bute from St Mary's Street in 1863.

The Golden Cross has one of fourteen remaining ceramic bar counters in the United Kingdom. The other ceramic counter in Wales is located at the in Waterloo Hotel in the Newport district of Pillgwenlly. Dunnill replicated the design with grotesques at the Mountain Daisy pub in Sunderland, and the Gunmakers Arms Birmingham. An almost identical tiled frieze design is at the White Swan pub in Birmingham.

Interior Gallery

References

External links

1903 in Wales
Castle, Cardiff
Commercial buildings completed in 1903
Grade II listed buildings in Cardiff
Grade II listed pubs in Wales
LGBT pubs in the United Kingdom
National Inventory Pubs
Pubs in Cardiff